Deadringer is the debut studio album by RJD2. It was released on Definitive Jux on July 23, 2002. It features vocal contributions from Blueprint, Jakki da Motamouth, and Copywrite. Some editions include a hidden song on the last track, titled "Here's What's Left." The album was reissued in 2009 with two additional tracks.

"Ghostwriter" was featured in advertisements for Washington State Lottery and Wells Fargo, as well as in the film Wimbledon.

Critical reception

Noel Dix of Exclaim! gave Deadringer a favorable review and commented that the album "plays very much like the soundtrack to a motion picture". Sam Chennault of Pitchfork called it "an essential purchase for any fan of instrumental hip-hop". Doug Levy of CMJ New Music Report felt that "DJ Shadow may have started the instrumental hip-hop revolution, but RJD2 is here to make the coup a reality".

Chris Ryan of Spin wrote that RJD2 "goes spelunking for everything from flamenco and pastoral folk to the kind of raw funk breaks that most groove merchants only dream of uncovering". Tony Van Groningen of Stylus Magazine said that "RJD2 effortlessly changes directions and adds unexpected elements to the mix that do more to perfect the songs than to muddle them up".

Spin placed Deadringer at number 31 on its year-end list of the best albums of 2002. Kludge placed it at number three on its list of the year's best albums. In 2015, Fact placed it at number 28 on its "100 Best Indie Hip-Hop Records of All Time" list.

Track listing

Notes:
Bonus track "Here's What's Left" does not appear on some versions, including vinyl releases and the 2009 reissue.
The 2009 reissue bonus tracks originally appeared on the 2002 UK version of the album.

Charts

References

External links
 

2002 debut albums
RJD2 albums
Definitive Jux albums